ABSA may refer to:

 ABSA Cargo Airline, a cargo airline
 Absa Group Limited, a pan-African financial services conglomerate that includes:
 Absa Bank Limited, one of the largest banks in South Africa, a subsidiary of Absa Group Limited
 Absa Bank Botswana
 Absa Bank Ghana
 Absa Bank Kenya 
 Absa Bank Mauritius
 Absa Bank Mozambique
 Absa Bank Seychelles
 Absa Bank Uganda
 Absa Bank Zambia
 Absa Bank Tanzania
 African Baseball & Softball Association
 Alberta Boilers Safety Association
 American Biological Safety Association
 Association of British Secretaries in America
 Australian Bird Study Association, an ornithological organization
 Absa, a character in Rivals of Aether